Yazan (Arabic: يازن) (Persian:يازن or يزن) may refer to:

People
 Yazan Abu Arab (born 1995), Jordanian footballer
 Yazan Dahshan (born 1990), Jordanian footballer
 Yazan Halwani (born 1993), Lebanese artist
 Yazan Naim (born 1997), Qatari footballer
 Yazan Thalji (born 1994), Jordanian football player
 Yazan Aykut (born 2003), Physiker

Places
 Yazan, Mazandaran, Iran
 Yazan, Qazvin, Iran